Friedrichsfeld locations in Germany:
 Friedrichsfeld (Voerde), Voerde
Friedrichsfeld (Niederrhein) station
 Friedrichsfeld (Mannheim), Mannheim
Neu-Edingen/Mannheim-Friedrichsfeld station

Surname Friedrichsfeld:
David Friedrichsfeld (1755–1810), writer

see also
 Friedrichsfelde, Berlin